Navajo or Navaho (Navajo:   or  ) is a Southern Athabaskan language of the Na-Dené family, through which it is related to languages spoken across the western areas of North America. Navajo is spoken primarily in the Southwestern United States, especially on the Navajo Nation. It is one of the most widely spoken Native American languages and is the most widely spoken north of the Mexico–United States border, with almost 170,000 Americans speaking Navajo at home as of 2011.

The language has struggled to keep a healthy speaker base, although this problem has been alleviated to some extent by extensive education programs in the Navajo Nation, including the creation of versions of the films Finding Nemo and Star Wars dubbed into Navajo. 

The United States in World War II used the Navajo language to develop a system of code talkers to relay messages that could not be cracked.

Navajo has a fairly large phoneme inventory, including several uncommon consonants that are not found in English. Its four basic vowels are distinguished for nasality, length, and tone. It has both agglutinative and fusional elements: it relies on affixes to modify verbs, and nouns are typically created from multiple morphemes, but in both cases these morphemes are fused irregularly and beyond easy recognition. Basic word order is subject–object–verb, though it is highly flexible to pragmatic factors. Verbs are conjugated for aspect and mood, and given affixes for the person and number of both subjects and objects, as well as a host of other variables.

The language's orthography, which was developed in the late 1930s after a series of prior attempts, is based on the Latin script. Most Navajo vocabulary is Athabaskan in origin, as the language has been conservative with loanwords since its early stages.

Nomenclature
It was borrowed into Spanish to refer to an area of present-day northwestern New Mexico, and later into English for the Navajo tribe and their language. The alternative spelling Navaho is considered antiquated; even anthropologist Berard Haile spelled it with a "j" in accordance with contemporary usage despite his personal objections.

Classification
Navajo is an Athabaskan language; Navajo and Apache languages make up the southernmost branch of the family. Most of the other Athabaskan languages are located in Alaska, northwestern Canada, and along the North American Pacific coast.

Most languages in the Athabaskan family have tones. However, this feature evolved independently in all subgroups; Proto-Athabaskan had no tones. In each case, tone evolved from glottalic consonants at the ends of morphemes; however, the progression of these consonants into tones has not been consistent, with some related morphemes being pronounced with high tones in some Athabaskan languages and low tones in others. It has been posited that Navajo and Chipewyan, which have no common ancestor more recent than Proto-Athabaskan and possess many pairs of corresponding but opposite tones, evolved from different dialects of Proto-Athabaskan that pronounced these glottalic consonants differently. Proto-Athabaskan diverged fully into separate languages circa 500 BC.

Navajo is most closely related to Western Apache, with which it shares a similar tonal scheme and more than 92 percent of its vocabulary. It is estimated that the Apachean linguistic groups separated and became established as distinct societies, of which the Navajo were one, somewhere between 1300 and 1525. As a member of the Western Apachean group, Navajo's closest relative is the Mescalero-Chiricahua language. Navajo is generally considered mutually intelligible with all other Apachean languages.

History

The Apachean languages, of which Navajo is one, are thought to have arrived in the American Southwest from the north by 1500, probably passing through Alberta and Wyoming. Archaeological finds considered to be proto-Navajo have been located in the far northern New Mexico around the La Plata, Animas and Pine rivers, dating to around 1500. In 1936, linguist Edward Sapir showed how the arrival of the Navajo people in the new arid climate among the corn agriculturalists of the Pueblo area was reflected in their language by tracing the changing meanings of words from Proto-Athabaskan to Navajo. For example, the word *dè:, which in Proto-Athabaskan meant "horn" and "dipper made from animal horn", in Navajo came to mean "gourd" or "dipper made from gourd". Likewise, the Proto-Athabaskan word *ɫ-yáxs "snow lies on the ground" in Navajo became sàs "corn lies on the ground". Similarly, the Navajo word for "corn" is nà:-dą:, derived from two Proto-Athabaskan roots meaning "enemy" and "food", suggesting that the Navajo originally considered corn to be "food of the enemy" when they first arrived among the Pueblo people.

Navajo Code
During World War II, the United States of America government used a code based on the Navajo language to use as secret communication. These code talkers would relay secret messages using the code. At the end of the war the code remained unbroken. The code worked by assigning Navajo words to common military phrases. The code proved for the most part effective for conveying secrecy, as the Navajo language was seldom learned by spies attempting to break American codes. These Navajo code talkers were widely recognized for their contributions to WWII. Major Howard Connor, 5th Marine Division Signal Officer stated, "Were it not for the Navajos, the Marines would never have taken Iwo Jima."

Colonization and decline

Navajo lands were initially colonized by the Spanish in the early seventeenth century, shortly after this area was annexed as part of the Spanish viceroyalty of New Spain. When the United States annexed these territories in 1848 following the Mexican–American War, the English-speaking settlers allowed Navajo children to attend their schools. In some cases, the United States established separate schools for Navajo and other Native American children. In the late 19th century, it founded boarding schools, often operated by religious missionary groups. In efforts to acculturate the children, school authorities insisted that they learn to speak English and practice Christianity. Students routinely had their mouths washed out with lye soap as a punishment if they did speak Navajo. Consequently, when these students grew up and had children of their own, they often did not teach them Navajo, in order to prevent them from being punished.

Robert W. Young and William Morgan (Navajo), who both worked for the Navajo Agency of the Bureau of Indian Affairs, developed and published a practical orthography in 1937. It helped spread education among Navajo speakers. In 1943 the men collaborated on The Navajo Language, a dictionary organized by the roots of the language. In World War II, the United States military used speakers of Navajo as code talkers—to transmit top-secret military messages over telephone and radio in a code based on Navajo. The language was considered ideal because of its grammar, which differs strongly from that of German and Japanese, and because no published Navajo dictionaries existed at the time.

By the 1960s, indigenous languages of the United States had been declining in use for some time. Native American language use began to decline more quickly in this decade as paved roads were built and English-language radio was broadcast to tribal areas. Navajo was no exception, although its large speaker pool—larger than that of any other Native language in the United States—gave it more staying power than most. Adding to the language's decline, federal acts passed in the 1950s to increase educational opportunities for Navajo children had resulted in pervasive use of English in their schools.

In more recent years, the number of monolingual Navajo speakers have been in the decline, and most younger Navajo people are bilingual. Near the 1990s, many Navajo children have little to no knowledge in Navajo language, only knowing English.

Revitalization and current status
In 1968, U.S. President Lyndon B. Johnson signed the Bilingual Education Act, which provided funds for educating young students who are not native English speakers. The Act had mainly been intended for Spanish-speaking children—particularly Mexican Americans—but it applied to all recognized linguistic minorities. Many Native American tribes seized the chance to establish their own bilingual education programs. However, qualified teachers who were fluent in Native languages were scarce, and these programs were largely unsuccessful.

However, data collected in 1980 showed that 85 percent of Navajo first-graders were bilingual, compared to 62 percent of Navajo of all ages—early evidence of a resurgence of use of their traditional language among younger people. In 1984, to counteract the language's historical decline, the Navajo Nation Council decreed that the Navajo language would be available and comprehensive for students of all grade levels in schools of the Navajo Nation. This effort was aided by the fact that, largely due to the work of Young and Morgan, Navajo is one of the best-documented Native American languages. In 1980 they published a monumental expansion of their work on the language, organized by word (first initial of vowel or consonant) in the pattern of English dictionaries, as requested by Navajo students. The Navajo Language: A Grammar and Colloquial Dictionary also included a 400-page grammar, making it invaluable for both native speakers and students of the language. Particularly in its organization of verbs, it was oriented to Navajo speakers. They expanded this work again in 1987, with several significant additions, and this edition continues to be used as an important text.

The Native American language education movement has been met with adversity, such as by English-only campaigns in some areas in the late 1990s. However, Navajo-immersion programs have cropped up across the Navajo Nation. Statistical evidence shows that Navajo-immersion students generally do better on standardized tests than their counterparts educated only in English. Some educators have remarked that students who know their native languages feel a sense of pride and identity validation. Since 1989, Diné College, a Navajo tribal community college, has offered an associate degree in the subject of Navajo. This program includes language, literature, culture, medical terminology, and teaching courses and produces the highest number of Navajo teachers of any institution in the United States. About 600 students attend per semester. One major university that teaches classes in the Navajo language is Arizona State University. In 1992, Young and Morgan published another major work on Navajo: Analytical Lexicon of Navajo, with the assistance of Sally Midgette (Navajo). This work is organized by root, the basis of Athabaskan languages.

A 1991 survey of 682 preschoolers on the Navajo Reservation Head Start program found that 54 percent were monolingual English speakers, 28 percent were bilingual in English and Navajo, and 18 percent spoke only Navajo. This study noted that while the preschool staff knew both languages, they spoke English to the children most of the time. In addition, most of the children's parents spoke to the children in English more often than in Navajo. The study concluded that the preschoolers were in "almost total immersion in English". An American Community Survey taken in 2011 found that 169,369 Americans spoke Navajo at home—0.3 percent of Americans whose primary home language was not English. Of primary Navajo speakers, 78.8 percent reported they spoke English "very well", a fairly high percentage overall but less than among other Americans speaking a different Native American language (85.4 percent). Navajo was the only Native American language afforded its own category in the survey; domestic Navajo speakers represented 46.4 percent of all domestic Native language speakers (only 195,407 Americans have a different home Native language). As of July 2014, Ethnologue classes Navajo as "6b" (In Trouble), signifying that few, but some, parents teach the language to their offspring and that concerted efforts at revitalization could easily protect the language. Navajo had a high population for a language in this category. About half of all Navajo people live on Navajo Nation land, an area spanning parts of Arizona, New Mexico, and Utah; others are dispersed throughout the United States. Under tribal law, fluency in Navajo is mandatory for candidates to the office of the President of the Navajo Nation.

Both original and translated media have been produced in Navajo. The first works tended to be religious texts translated by missionaries, including the Bible. From 1943 to about 1957, the Navajo Agency of the BIA published Ádahooníłígíí ("Events"), the first newspaper in Navajo and the only one to be written entirely in Navajo. It was edited by Robert W. Young and William Morgan, Sr. (Navajo). They had collaborated on The Navajo Language, a major language dictionary published that same year, and continued to work on studying and documenting the language in major works for the next few decades. Today an AM radio station, KTNN, broadcasts in Navajo and English, with programming including music and NFL games; AM station KNDN broadcasts only in Navajo. When Super Bowl XXX was broadcast in Navajo in 1996, it was the first time a Super Bowl had been carried in a Native American language. In 2013, the 1977 film Star Wars was translated into Navajo. It was the first major motion picture translated into any Native American language.

On October 5, 2018, an early beta of a Navajo course was released on Duolingo.

Education
After many Navajo schools were closed during World War II, a program aiming to provide education to Navajo children was funded in the 1950s, where the number of students quickly doubled in the next decade.

The Navajo Nation operates Tséhootsooí Diné Bi'ólta', a Navajo language immersion school for grades K-8 in Fort Defiance, Arizona. Located on the Arizona-New Mexico border in the southeastern quarter of the Navajo Reservation, the school strives to revitalize Navajo among children of the Window Rock Unified School District. Tséhootsooí Diné Bi'ólta' has thirteen Navajo language teachers who instruct only in the Navajo language, and no English, while five English language teachers instruct in the English language. Kindergarten and first grade are taught completely in the Navajo language, while English is incorporated into the program during third grade, when it is used for about 10% of instruction.

According to the Navajo Nation Education Policies, the Navajo Tribal Council requests that schools teach both English and Navajo so that the children would remain bilingual, though their influence over the school systems was very low. A small number of preschool programs provided the Navajo immersion curriculum, which taught children basic Navajo vocabulary and grammar under the assumption that they have no prior knowledge in the Navajo language.

Phonology

Navajo has a fairly large consonant inventory. Ejective consonants are those that are pronounced with a glottalic initiation. Navajo also has a simple glottal stop used after vowels, and every word that would otherwise begin with a vowel is pronounced with an initial glottal stop. Consonant clusters are uncommon, aside from frequent placing  or  before fricatives.

Each exists in both oral and nasalized forms, and can be either short or long. Navajo also distinguishes for tone between high and low, with the low tone typically regarded as the default. However, some linguists have suggested that Navajo does not possess true tones, but only a pitch accent system similar to that of Japanese. In general, Navajo speech also has a slower speech tempo than English does.

Grammar

Typology
Navajo is difficult to classify in terms of broad morphological typology: it relies heavily on affixes—mainly prefixes—like agglutinative languages, but these affixes are joined in unpredictable, overlapping ways that make them difficult to segment, a trait of fusional languages. In general, Navajo verbs contain more morphemes than nouns do (on average, 11 for verbs compared to 4–5 for nouns), but noun morphology is less transparent. Depending on the source, Navajo is either classified as a fusional agglutinative or even polysynthetic language, as it shows mechanisms from all three.

In terms of basic word order, Navajo has been classified as a subject–object–verb language. However, some speakers order the subject and object based on "noun ranking". In this system, nouns are ranked in three categories—humans, animals, and inanimate objects—and within these categories, nouns are ranked by strength, size, and intelligence. Whichever of the subject and object has a higher rank comes first. As a result, the agent of an action may be syntactically ambiguous. The highest rank position is held by humans and lightning. Other linguists such as Eloise Jelinek consider Navajo to be a discourse configurational language, in which word order is not fixed by syntactic rules, but determined by pragmatic factors in the communicative context.

Verbs
In Navajo, verbs are the main elements of their sentences, imparting a large amount of information. The verb is based on a stem, which is made of a root to identify the action and the semblance of a suffix to convey mode and aspect; however, this suffix is fused beyond separability. The stem is given somewhat more transparent prefixes to indicate, in this order, the following information: postpositional object, postposition, adverb-state, iterativity, number, direct object, deictic information, another adverb-state, mode and aspect, subject, classifier (see later on), mirativity and two-tier evidentiality. Some of these prefixes may be null; for example, there is only a plural marker (da/daa) and no readily identifiable marker for the other grammatical numbers.

Navajo does not distinguish strict tense per se; instead, an action's position in time is conveyed through mode, aspect, but also via time adverbials or context. Each verb has an inherent aspect and can be conjugated in up to seven modes. These forms are as follows:

Modes:
 Imperfective – an incomplete action; can be used in past, present, or future time frames
 Perfective – a complete action; usually signifying the past tense but also applied to future states (e.g. "he will have gone")
 Usitative – a usual or typical action
 Iterative – a recurrent or repetitive action; often used interchangeably with the usitative
 Progressive – ongoing action; unlike the imperfective, the focus is more on the progression across space or time than incompleteness
 Future – a prospective action, analogous to the future tense
 Optative – a potential or desired action, similar to the subjunctive mood of Indo-European languages

Aspects:
 Momentaneous – an action that takes place at a specific point in time
 Continuative – an action that covers an indefinite timeframe, without a specific beginning, goal, or even temporal direction
 Durative – similar to the continuative, but not covering locomotion verbs
 Conclusive – similar to the durative, but emphasizing the completed nature of the action when in the perfective mode
 Repetitive – an action that is repeated in some way, dependent on the sub-aspect and sub-sub-aspect type used
 Semelfactive – an action that is distinguished from a connected group or series of actions
 Distributive – an action that occurs among a group of targets or locations
 Diversative – an action that occurs "here and there", among an unspecified group of targets or locations
 Reversative – an action involving change in physical or metaphorical direction
 Conative – an action the subject attempts to perform
 Transitional – an action involving transition from one status or form to another
 Cursive – an action of moving in a straight line in space or time

For any verb, the usitative and repetitive modes share the same stem, as do the progressive and future modes; these modes are distinguished with prefixes. However, pairs of modes other than these may also share the same stem, as illustrated in the following example, where the verb "to play" is conjugated into each of the five mode paradigms:

 Imperfective: -né – is playing, was playing, will be playing
 Perfective: -neʼ – played, had played, will have played
 Progressive/future: -neeł – is playing along / will play, will be playing
 Usitative/repetitive: -neeh – usually plays, frequently plays, repeatedly plays
 Optative: -neʼ – would play, may play

The basic set of subject prefixes for the imperfective mode, as well as the actual conjugation of the verb into these person and number categories, are as follows.

The remaining piece of these conjugated verbs—the prefix na-—is called an "outer" or "disjunct" prefix. It is the marker of the Continuative aspect (to play about).

Navajo distinguishes between the first, second, third, and fourth persons in the singular, dual, and plural numbers. The fourth person is similar to the third person, but is generally used for indefinite, theoretical actors rather than defined ones. Despite the potential for extreme verb complexity, only the mode/aspect, subject, classifier, and stem are absolutely necessary. Furthermore, Navajo negates clauses by surrounding the verb with the circumclitic doo= ... =da (e.g. mósí doo nitsaa da 'the cat is not big'). Dooda, as a single word, corresponds to English no.

Classificatory verbs are a set of verbal roots distinguishing eleven shapes and three classes of motion for each shape. The motion classes are:

 handle: movement of an object by continuing physical contact throughout the movement (take, bring, carry, lower, attach,...)
 propel: movement of an object by propulsion (throw, toss, drop,...)
 free flight: movement of a subject of its own without causative agent (fly, fall,...)

The shapes are listed here with their standard names and their corresponding handle root.

 Solid Roundish Objects (-ą́): apple, coin,...
 Load, Pack, Burden (-yį́): furniture, large body of water...
 Non-Compact Matter (-ł-jool): hay, wig,...
 Slender Flexible Object (-lá): rope, belt, but also dual objects like gloves,..

 Slender Stiff Object (-tą́): stick, pen,...
 Flat Flexible Object (-ł-tsooz): sheet, paper,...
 Mushy Matter (-tłééʼ): butter, mud, frog,...
 Plural Objects 1 (-nil): severality of objects

 Plural Objects 2 (-jaaʼ): profusion of small objects like seeds,...
 Open Container (-ką́): water in a bottle, seeds in a box, snow in a truck,...
 Animate Object (-ł-tį́): person, doll,...

For example, Navajo has no single verb that corresponds to the English 'give'. To say 'give me some hay', the Navajo verb níłjool (Non-Compact Matter) must be used, while for 'give me a cigarette' the verb nítįįh (Slender Stiff Object) must be used. Navajo also contains a separate system of classifiers that generally marks for voice. There are four classifiers: Ø-, ł-, d-, and l-, placed between the personal prefixes and the verbal stem. The ł- classifier indicates causation (transitivity increase), e.g. yibéézh (yi-Ø-béézh) 'it's boiling' vs. yiłbéézh (yi-ł-béézh) 'he's boiling it'. The d- and l- classifiers indicate passive voice (transitivity reduction), e.g. yizéés (yi-Ø-zéés) 'he's singing it' vs. yidéés (yi-d-zéés) 'it's being sung' . The d- classifier is used to detransitivize verbs with Ø-, while l- is used for verbs with ł-.

Nouns
Nouns are not required to form a complete Navajo sentence. Besides the extensive information that can be communicated with a verb, Navajo speakers may alternate between the third and fourth person to distinguish between two already specified actors, similarly to how speakers of languages with grammatical gender may repeatedly use pronouns.

Most nouns are not inflected for number, and plurality is usually encoded directly in the verb through the use of various prefixes or aspects, though this is by no means mandatory. In the following example, the verb on the right is used with the plural prefix da- and switches to the distributive aspect.

Some verbal roots encode number in their lexical definition (see classificatory verbs above). When available, the use of the correct verbal root is mandatory:

Number marking on nouns occurs only for terms of kinship and age-sex groupings. Other prefixes that can be added to nouns include possessive markers (e.g. chidí 'car' – shichidí 'my car') and a few adjectival enclitics. Generally, an upper limit for prefixes on a noun is about four or five.

Nouns are also not marked for case, this traditionally being covered by word order.

Other parts of speech

Other parts of speech in Navajo are also relatively immutable, and tend to be short. These parts of speech include question particles, demonstrative adjectives, relative pronouns, interjections, conjunctions, and adverbs (both unique ones and those based on verbs). The Navajo numeral system is decimal, and some example numbers follow.

1 – tʼááłáʼí
2 – naaki
3 – tááʼ
4 – dį́į́ʼ
5 – ashdlaʼ

6 – hastą́ą́
7 – tsostsʼid
8 – tseebíí
9 – náhástʼéí
10 – neeznáá

11 – łaʼtsʼáadah
12 – naakitsʼáadah
13 – tááʼtsʼáadah
14 – dį́į́ʼtsʼáadah
15 – ashdlaʼáadah

16 – hastą́ʼáadah
17 – tsostsʼidtsáadah
20 – naadiin
300 – táadi neeznádiin
4,567 – dį́į́di mííl dóó baʼaan ashdladi neeznádiin dóó baʼaan hastą́diin dóó baʼaan tsostsʼid

Navajo does not contain a single part of speech analogous to adjectives; rather, some verbs describe static qualitative attributes (e.g. nitsaa 'he/she/it is large'), and demonstrative adjectives (e.g. díí 'this/these') are their own part of speech. However, these verbs, known as "neuter verbs", are distinguished by only having the imperfective mode, as they describe continuous states of being.

Vocabulary
The vast majority of Navajo vocabulary is of Athabaskan origin. However, the vocabulary size is still fairly small; one estimate counted 6,245 noun bases and 9,000 verb bases, with most of these nouns being derived from verbs. Prior to the European colonization of the Americas, Navajo did not borrow much from other languages, including from other Athabaskan and even Apachean languages. The Athabaskan family is fairly diverse in both phonology and morphology due to its languages' prolonged relative isolation. Even the Pueblo peoples, with whom the Navajo interacted with for centuries and borrowed cultural customs, have lent few words to the Navajo language. After Spain and Mexico took over Navajo lands, the language did not incorporate many Spanish words, either.

This resistance to word absorption extended to English, at least until the mid-twentieth century. Around this point, the Navajo language began importing some, though still not many, English words, mainly by young schoolchildren exposed to English.

Navajo has expanded its vocabulary to include Western technological and cultural terms through calques and Navajo descriptive terms. For example, the phrase for English tank is chidí naa'naʼí beeʼeldǫǫhtsoh bikááʼ dah naaznilígíí 'vehicle that crawls around, by means of which big explosions are made, and that one sits on at an elevation'. This language purism also extends to proper nouns, such as the names of U.S. states (e.g. Hoozdo 'Arizona' and Yootó 'New Mexico'; see also hahoodzo 'state') and languages (naakaii 'Spanish').

Only one Navajo word has been fully absorbed into the English language: hogan (from Navajo hooghan) – a term referring to the traditional houses. Another word with limited English recognition is chindi (an evil spirit of the deceased). The taxonomic genus name Uta may be of Navajo origin. It has been speculated that English-speaking settlers were reluctant to take on more Navajo loanwords compared to many other Native American languages, including the Hopi language, because the Navajo were among the most violent resisters to colonialism.

Orthography
Early attempts at a Navajo orthography were made in the late nineteenth and early twentieth centuries. One such attempt was based on the Latin alphabet, particularly the English variety, with some additional letters and diacritics. Anthropologists were frustrated by Navajo's having several sounds that are not found in English and lack of other sounds that are. Finally, the current Navajo orthography was developed between 1935 and 1940 by Young and Morgan.

An apostrophe (ʼ) is used to mark ejective consonants (e.g. chʼ, tłʼ) as well as mid-word or final glottal stops. However, initial glottal stops are usually not marked.

The voiceless glottal fricative is normally written as h, but appears as x after the consonant s (optionally after sh) at syllable boundary, and when it represents the depreciative augment found after stem initial (ex:). The voiced velar fricative is written as y before i and e (where it is palatalized ), as w before o (where it is labialized ), and as gh before a.

Navajo represents nasalized vowels with an ogonek ( ˛ ), sometimes described as a reverse cedilla; and represents the voiceless alveolar lateral fricative with a barred L (capital Ł, lowercase ł). The ogonek is placed centrally under a vowel, but it was imported from Polish and Lithuanian, which do not use it under certain vowels such as o or any vowels with accent marks. For example, in proper Navajo writing, the ogonek below lowercase a is written centered below the letter, whereas fonts for a with ogonek intended for Polish and Lithuanian such as those used in common Web browsers render the ogonek connected to the bottom right of the letter.  no Unicode font has been developed to properly accommodate Navajo typography. Google is working to correct this oversight with Noto fonts.

The first Navajo-capable typewriter was developed in preparation for a Navajo newspaper and dictionary created in the 1940s. The advent of early computers in the 1960s necessitated special fonts to input Navajo text, and the first Navajo font was created in the 1970s. Navajo virtual keyboards were made available for iOS devices in November 2012 and Android devices in August 2013.

Sample text
This is the first paragraph of a Navajo short story.

Navajo original: 

English translation: Some crazy boys decided to make some wine to sell, so they each planted grapevines and, working hard on them, they raised them to maturity. Then, having made wine, they each filled a goatskin with it. They agreed that at no time would they give each other a drink of it, and they then set out for town lugging the goatskins on their backs (...)

See also

Citations

General and cited references

Further reading

Educational
 Blair, Robert W.; Simmons, Leon; & Witherspoon, Gary. (1969). Navaho Basic Course. Brigham Young University Printing Services.
 
 Goossen, Irvy W. (1967). Navajo made easier: A course in conversational Navajo. Flagstaff, AZ: Northland Press.
 Goossen, Irvy W. (1995). Diné bizaad: Speak, read, write Navajo. Flagstaff, AZ: Salina Bookshelf. 
 Goossen, Irvy W. (1997). Diné bizaad: Sprechen, Lesen und Schreiben Sie Navajo. Loder, P. B. (transl.). Flagstaff, AZ: Salina Bookshelf.
 Haile, Berard. (1941–1948). Learning Navaho, (Vols. 1–4). St. Michaels, AZ: St. Michael's Mission.
 Platero, Paul R. (1986). Diné bizaad bee naadzo: A conversational Navajo text for secondary schools, colleges and adults. Farmington, NM: Navajo Preparatory School.
 Platero, Paul R.; Legah, Lorene; & Platero, Linda S. (1985). Diné bizaad bee naʼadzo: A Navajo language literacy and grammar text. Farmington, NM: Navajo Language Institute.
 Tapahonso, Luci, & Schick, Eleanor. (1995). Navajo ABC: A Diné alphabet book. New York: Macmillan Books for Young Readers. 
 Witherspoon, Gary. (1985). Diné Bizaad Bóhooʼaah for secondary schools, colleges, and adults. Farmington, NM: Navajo Language Institute.
 Witherspoon, Gary. (1986). Diné Bizaad Bóhooʼaah I: A conversational Navajo text for secondary schools, colleges and adults. Farmington, NM: Navajo Language Institute.
 Wilson, Alan. (1969). Breakthrough Navajo: An introductory course. Gallup, NM: The University of New Mexico, Gallup Branch.
 Wilson, Alan. (1970). Laughter, the Navajo way. Gallup, NM: The University of New Mexico at Gallup.
 Wilson, Alan. (1978). Speak Navajo: An intermediate text in communication. Gallup, NM: University of New Mexico, Gallup Branch.
 Wilson, Garth A. (1995). Conversational Navajo workbook: An introductory course for non-native speakers. Blanding, UT: Conversational Navajo Publications. .
 Yazzie, Sheldon A. (2005). Navajo for Beginners and Elementary Students. Chapel Hill: The University of North Carolina at Chapel Hill Press.
 Yazzie, Evangeline Parsons, and Margaret Speas (2008). Diné Bizaad Bínáhoo'aah: Rediscovering the Navajo Language. Flagstaff, AZ: Salina Bookshelf, Inc.

Linguistics and other reference
 Frishberg, Nancy. (1972). Navajo object markers and the great chain of being. In J. Kimball (Ed.), Syntax and semantics (Vol. 1, p. 259–266). New York: Seminar Press.
 Hale, Kenneth L. (1973). A note on subject–object inversion in Navajo. In B. B. Kachru, R. B. Lees, Y. Malkiel, A. Pietrangeli, & S. Saporta (Eds.), Issues in linguistics: Papers in honor of Henry and Renée Kahane (p. 300–309). Urbana: University of Illinois Press.
 Hardy, Frank. (1979). Navajo Aspectual Verb Stem Variation. Albuquerque: University of New Mexico Press.
 Hoijer, Harry. (1945). Navaho phonology. University of New Mexico publications in anthropology, (No. 1).
 
 
 
 
 
 
 Hoijer, Harry. (1970). A Navajo lexicon. University of California Publications in Linguistics (No. 78). Berkeley: University of California Press.
 
 Kari, James. (1976). Navajo verb prefix phonology. Garland Publishing Co.
 Reichard, Gladys A. (1951). Navaho grammar. Publications of the American Ethnological Society (Vol. 21). New York: J. J. Augustin.
 
 Sapir, Edward, & Hoijer, Harry. (1942). Navaho texts. William Dwight Whitney series, Linguistic Society of America.
 Sapir, Edward, & Hoijer, Harry. (1967). Phonology and morphology of the Navaho language. Berkeley: University of California Press.
 Speas, Margaret. (1990). Phrase structure in natural language. Kluwer Academic Publishers. 
 
 Wall, C. Leon, & Morgan, William. (1994). Navajo-English dictionary. New York: Hippocrene Books. . (Originally published [1958] by U.S. Dept. of the Interior, Branch of Education, Bureau of Indian Affairs).
 
 
 Webster, Anthony K. (2009). Explorations in Navajo Poetry and Poetics. Albuquerque: University of New Mexico Press.
 
 Witherspoon, Gary. (1977). Language and Art in the Navajo Universe. Ann Arbor: University of Michigan Press. ; 
 Young, Robert W. (2000). The Navajo Verb System: An Overview. Albuquerque: University of New Mexico Press.  (hb);  (pbk)

External links

 Hózhǫ́ Náhásdlį́į́ʼ – Language of the Holy People (Navajo web site with flash and audio, helps with learning Navajo), gomyson.com
 Navajo Swadesh vocabulary list of basic words (from Wiktionary's Swadesh-list appendix)
 Contrasts between Navajo consonants (sound files from Peter Ladefoged). ucla.edu
 Navajo Language & Bilingual Links (from San Juan school district). sanjuan.k12.ut.us
 Navajo Language Academy, navajolanguageacademy.org
 Tuning in to Navajo: The Role of Radio in Native Language Maintenance, jan.ucc.nau.edu
 An Initial Exploration of the Navajo Nation's Language and Culture Initiative, jan.ucc.nau.edu
 Languagegeek Unicode fonts and Navajo keyboard layouts, languagegeek.com
 Navajo fonts, dinecollege.edu
 The Navajo Language, library.thinkquest.org
 Reflections on Navajo Poetry, ou.edu
 How to count in Navajo, languagesandnumbers.com
 Digital Public Library of America. Navajo-language items, various dates.
 iPad keyboard app
 Android keyboard app
 Android dictionary app

Linguistics
 Navajo reflections of a general theory of lexical argument structure (Ken Hale & Paul Platero), museunacional.ufrj.br
 Remarks on the syntax of the Navajo verb part I: Preliminary observations on the structure of the verb (Ken Hale), museunacional.ufrj.br
 The Navajo Prolongative and Lexical Structure (Carlota Smith), cc.utexas.edu
 A Computational Analysis of Navajo Verb Stems (David Eddington & Jordan Lachler), linguistics.byu.edu
 Grammaticization of Tense in Navajo: The Evolution of nt'éé (Chee, Ashworth, Buescher & Kubacki), linguistics.ucsb.edu
 A methodology for the investigation of speaker's knowledge of structure in Athabaskan (Joyce McDonough & Rachel Sussman), urresearch.rochester.edu
 How to use Young and Morgan's The Navajo Language (Joyce McDonough), bcs.rochester.edu
 Time in Navajo: Direct and Indirect Interpretation (Carlota S. Smith, Ellavina T. Perkins, Theodore B. Fernald), cc.utexas.edu
 OLAC Resources in and about the Navajo language

 
Agglutinative languages
Fusional languages
Indigenous languages of Arizona
Indigenous languages of New Mexico
Indigenous languages of the Southwestern United States
Na-Dene languages
Native American language revitalization
Polysynthetic languages
Pueblo linguistic area
Subject–object–verb languages
Tonal languages